Reims University (French: Université de Reims or Rheims) was one of the largest and most important universities in Europe during the early modern era. It was established in 1548 by papal bull, but shut down in 1793, during the French Revolution.

The University of Reims Champagne-Ardenne was officially established in 1967.

See also 
 List of early modern universities in Europe

References 

Defunct universities and colleges in France
1548 establishments in France
1793 disestablishments in France
Educational institutions established in the 1540s

Educational institutions disestablished in the 1790s